Les Invisibles is a French documentary film written and directed by Sébastien Lifshitz and released in 2012.

Synopsis 
Men and women who, born during the interwar period, have nothing in common apart from being homosexuals and have chosen to live in broad daylight in an era when society rejected homosexuality. They loved, desired, and fought to be recognized. Today, they recount this rebellious life, divided between the will to fit in with everyone else and the obligation to invent a freedom to flourish.

Participation 
Yann and Pierre, Bernard and Jaques, Pierrot, Thérèse, Christian, Catherine and Elisabeth Monique, Jaques.

Creation 
Lifshitz spent nearly a year and a half searching for the interviewees necessary to film the documentary. He contacted numerous connections he had in France, namely ARIS in Lyon. Lifshitz met 70 people and filmed 10 portraits of couples and individuals, although not all were included in the final montage.

Distinctions 
Lifshitz received the Pierre Guénin Prize against Homophobia and for Equal Rights for this film and his next, Bambi (2013). According to a statement by SOS homophobia association, "Sebastian Lifshitz's work renders visible not only the LGBT population but especially its most forgotten categories."

Awards 

 2013: César for best documentary film
 2012: Festival Chéries-Chéris: Grand prix for documentary films
 2012: Face à Face Festival du film gay et lesbien de Saint-Étienne: Audience award - Grand prize for feature films
 2013: Étoile d'or du cinéma français for best documentary
 2012: Festival Âge d'or-Cinédécouvertes (Brussels): Audience award

Nominations 

 2012: British Film Institute Awards: Grierson Award

References 

2012 films
French LGBT-related films
2012 LGBT-related films
Documentary films about LGBT topics
2010s French films